was a Japanese artist and Olympic bronze medalist.

He was born in Hōhoku, which is now a part of Shimonoseki city in Yamaguchi prefecture. He studied under artists Kyūho Noda and Hokkai Takashima. His works have received accolades from the Institute of Japanese Style Painting, Seiryū Shaten, and the Bunten Exhibition. In 1934 he established the Shin Nihonga Kenkyūkai with other artists such as Kenji Yoshioka.

In 1936, he won a bronze medal in the painting category in the art competitions at the Berlin Games for his "アイスホッケー" ("Ice hockey"). The piece was later purchased by the Nazi Party, after which its whereabouts became unknown.

In 1938, he established the Shin Bijutsujin Kyoukai. Afterward, he moved to Kitakyushu city in Fukuoka prefecture, and continued producing work. He also worked as a lecturer at Saga University.

References

1907 births
1965 deaths
Japanese artists
Olympic bronze medalists in art competitions
People from Shimonoseki
Medalists at the 1936 Summer Olympics
Olympic competitors in art competitions